The 2005 Speedway Grand Prix was the 60th edition of the official World Championship and the 11th season in the Speedway Grand Prix era used to determine the Speedway World Champion.

Event format 
The format was changed for GP 2005 with 16 riders (instead of 24) taking part in each Grand Prix event, and over the course of 20 heats each rider started in 5 heats and raced against every other rider once (which is the classical round-robin formula of the individual tournament). The top eight scorers advanced to two semi-final heats, and the first and second riders from each semi-final advanced to the GP final heat.  All riders apart from the qualifiers for the final carried forward the points earned in the round-robin round over the course of the season.  The riders in the final received points (for the whole tournament, irrespective of how many points they had earned) as follows:

 1st place = 25 points
 2nd place = 20 points
 3rd place = 18 points
 4th place = 16 points

This formula was very similar to that in effect during the 1995-1997 GP editions, the difference being such that then all the 16 riders after the 20 heat round-robin round started in one additional heat (those from places 13-16 after round-robin in 21st, 9-12 in 22nd, 5-8 in 23rd, 1-4 in 24th being the Great Final), and all 16 received a constant number of points for a given place in a tournament (irrespective of how many points they had earned).

Qualification for Grand Prix 

For the 2005 season, there were 15 permanent riders, joined at each Grand Prix by one wild card. They were, in rider number order:

(1) Jason Crump 
(2) Tony Rickardsson 
(3) Greg Hancock  
(4) Leigh Adams 
(5) Nicki Pedersen  
(6) Tomasz Gollob  
(7) Andreas Jonsson  
(8) Jarosław Hampel 
(9) Hans Andersen 
(10) Bjarne Pedersen 
(11) Lee Richardson 
(12) Scott Nicholls 
(13) Ryan Sullivan 
(14) Antonio Lindback 
(15) Tomasz Chrzanowski

Calendar 

Result: 
Europe • Sweden • Slovenia • Great Britain • Copenhagen • Denmark • Scandinavia • Poland • Italy

Final classification

References

External links 
 List of results from Official Speedway GP site

2005
World I